Sociological Inquiry is a quarterly peer-reviewed academic journal published by Wiley-Blackwell on behalf of Alpha Kappa Delta.  The journal explores the human condition through a sociological lens. It was established in 1928 as The Quarterly and obtained its current title in 1961. The editor-in-chief is Peter B. Wood (Eastern Michigan University).
According to the Journal Citation Reports, the journal has a 2018 impact factor of 0.608, ranking it 123rd out of 148 journals in the category "Sociology".

References

External links 
 

Wiley-Blackwell academic journals
English-language journals
Publications established in 1928
Quarterly journals
Sociology journals